Tougher Than Leather is the 28th studio album by country singer Willie Nelson. It was his first album of original material since Red Headed Stranger eight years before.

Reception

Crispin Sartwell of Record panned the album, calling it "country music in name only." He elaborated that whereas Nelson's earlier songs were honest ballads about concrete situations which listeners could relate to, Tougher Than Leather is built around high-handed philosophical preaching. He also criticized the lack of variety in the music, describing it as "utterly bland and homogeneous." 

Stephen Thomas Erlewine of Allmusic gave the album a mixed review, saying the performance by Nelson's touring band was "robust" yet many of the songs were mediocre and "the album simply doesn't hold together thematically".

Track listing
All tracks composed by Willie Nelson, except where indicated
"My Love for the Rose" - 0:37
"Changing Skies" - 3:03
"Tougher Than Leather" - 4:53
"Little Old Fashioned Karma" - 3:18
"Somewhere in Texas (Part I)" - 0:53
"The Beer Barrel Polka" (Traditional, arranged and played by Bobbie Nelson) - 2:43
"Summer of Roses" - 3:12
"Somewhere in Texas (Part II)" - 0:55
"My Love for the Rose" - 0:37
"The Convict and the Rose" (Robert King, Ballard MacDonald) - 3:52
"Changing Skies" - 0:54
"I Am the Forest" - 4:17
"Nobody Slides, My Friend" - 1:39

Personnel
Willie Nelson - guitar, arranger, vocals
Grady Martin - guitar
Jody Payne - guitar
Bee Spears - bass guitar
Paul English - drums
Bobbie Nelson - piano
Johnny Gimble - fiddle, mandolin
Mickey Raphael - harmonica

Chart performance

References

1983 albums
Willie Nelson albums
Columbia Records albums